Fouzi Alidra (born 6 August 1971) is a retired French football midfielder.

References

1971 births
Living people
French footballers
Nîmes Olympique players
Olympique Alès players
Association football midfielders
Ligue 1 players
Ligue 2 players